Kalamai is a traditional Chamorro corn / coconut pudding, sometimes referred to as coconut gelatin (though no gelatin is actually used). Original versions of kalamai called for masa harina, coconut milk, sugar, and water.  Subsequently, cornstarch has been used to thicken the dessert.  Red or green food coloring may be used to color the kalamai, followed by a sprinkling of cinnamon on the surface.  A few recipes add vanilla for additional flavoring.

The kalamai mixture, once thickened, is traditionally poured into a low rimmed tray to a half-inch thickness. This dessert is cooled, then sliced into squares. The pudding-like version of kalamai has a very creamy, soft texture.  This pudding is served just as a piece of pie is served.  The gelatin-like recipe yields a dessert that is firm like Jell-O.  It can be eaten with fingers.  Both versions of kalamai have a very distinct coconut and masa harina flavor.

See also
Kalamay

References 

Chamorro cuisine
Foods containing coconut
Guamanian desserts
Puddings